The Disappearance of Garcia Lorca is a 1996 Spanish-American drama-biographical film directed by Marcos Zurinaga. It is based on a book by Ian Gibson about the life and murder of Spanish poet Federico García Lorca. It stars Andy García as Lorca and Esai Morales as Ricardo, a journalist who investigates Lorca's disappearance during the early years of the Spanish Civil War. The film earned ALMA Award nominations for both Garcia and Morales, best feature film, and best Latino director for Zurinaga. It received an Imagen Award for Best Motion Picture.

References

External links 

1996 films
Triumph Films films
Spanish Civil War films
Biographical films about writers
1990s English-language films
English-language Spanish films
English-language French films
English-language Puerto Rican films
1990s Spanish films